Westchester Flames is an American soccer team based in New Rochelle, New York, United States. Founded in 1999, the team plays in USL League Two, the fourth tier of the American soccer pyramid.

The team plays its home games at City Park Stadium, where they have played since 2001. The team's colors are blue and white.

The team also fields a team in the USL’s Super-20 League, a league for players 17 to 20 years of age run under the United Soccer Leagues umbrella.

History
The team had your first season in 1999, when they finished with a respectable 7–9 record, under former New York Cosmos superstar Vladislav Bogicevic. Home games were played at Manhattanville College in Purchase, NY. In 2001, Westchester Flames were the champions of Premier Development League

Players

Notable former players

This list of notable former players comprises players who went on to play professional soccer after playing for the team in the Premier Development League, or those who previously played professionally before joining the team.

  Andre Akpan
  Jhonny Arteaga
  Dwight Barnett
  Scott Bolkan
  Kevin Burns
  Charlie Davies
  Rodrigo Faria
  Julius James
  Chris Megaloudis
  Ricky Schramm
  Ibrahim Yusuf
  Jake Keegan
  Lars Brownworth

Year-by-year

Honors
 USL PDL Eastern Conference Champions 2006
 USL PDL Northeast Division Champions 2006
 USL PDL Champions 2001
 USL PDL Eastern Conference Champions 2001
 USL PDL Northeast Division Champions 2001
 USL PDL Regular Season Champions 2000
 USL PDL Eastern Conference Champions 2000
 USL PDL Northeast Division Champions 2000

Head coaches
  Vladislav Bogićević (1999)
  Anthony Roros
  Ernest Inneh (2005–2006)
  Gus Skoufis (2007–present)

Stadia
 Manhattanville College; Purchase, New York (1999)
 Fordham University; Bronx, New York (2000)
 City Park Stadium; New Rochelle, New York (2001–2008, 2010–present)
 McKenna Field at New Rochelle High School; New Rochelle, New York (2009)

Average attendance
Attendance stats are calculated by averaging each team's self-reported home attendances from the historical match archive at http://www.uslsoccer.com/history/index_E.html.

 2005: 127
 2006: 143
 2007: 88
 2008: 115
 2009: 57 (lowest in PDL)
 2010: 80
 2011: 55
 2012: 140

References

External links
Official Site
Official PDL site

Association football clubs established in 1999
USL League Two teams
Men's soccer clubs in New York (state)
Sports in New Rochelle, New York
USL Second Division teams
1999 establishments in New York (state)